Gracillina is a monotypic moth genus of the family Erebidae. Its only species, Gracillina prosthenia, is found in Singapore. Both the genus and the species were first described by George Hampson in 1924.

References

Calpinae
Monotypic moth genera